Wirtinger's inequality is either of two inequalities named after Wilhelm Wirtinger:

 Wirtinger's inequality for functions
 Wirtinger inequality (2-forms)